Abdullah II Kaday was the cousin of Ibrahim Nikale, he succeeded Nikale after he lost a power struggle with the Yerima, the leader of the north. He was also the king who brought a return to the patrilineal succession of the earlier Sefuwa kings.

Rulers of the Kanem Empire

0918153730